Interstate 175 can mean:

 Interstate 175 in Florida (the only current highway with that name)
 Interstate 175 (Georgia), the proposed highway in Georgia
 Interstate 175 (Kentucky–Tennessee), a defunct highway in Kentucky and Tennessee

1